The Belarusian Super Cup is an annual one-match association football competition in Belarus organized by the Football Federation of Belarus. This competition serves as the season opener and is played between the Belarusian Premier League Champions and the Belarusian Cup Winners of the previous season. If a single team holds both titles, the Cup runners-up are invited. The match usually played in late February or early March each year.

History
The predecessor to Belarusian Super Cup - the semi-official competition named Season Cup was contested in July 1994 between then-current champions and Cup holders Dinamo Minsk and Cup runners-up Fandok Bobruisk. Dinamo won the match 5–3. The tournament was scrapped after just one edition.

The official Belarusian Super Cup competition was introduced in 2010 and is held every year since. Due to climate restrictions, it is usually played in enclosed Football Manege in Minsk.

Matches

Performance by club

References

External links
Football.by

 
2
National association football supercups